Lualaba is one of the 21 provinces of the Democratic Republic of the Congo created in the 2015 repartitioning.  Lualaba, Haut-Katanga, Haut-Lomami, and Tanganyika provinces are the result of the dismemberment of the former Katanga province.  Lualaba was formed from the Lualaba and Kolwezi districts.  Kolwezi was a hybrid city/district which was separated from its two territories and the city proper became the capital of the new province.

Former province
Lualaba Province was separated from Katanga Province on 30 June 1963. Then, on 24 April 1966, it was united with Katanga Oriental to form Sud-Katanga Province, which was later merged back into Katanga. The President of Lualaba, from 1965 the governor, was Dominique Diur who held office from 23 September 1963 until 24 April 1966.

References

External links

 
Provinces of the Democratic Republic of the Congo